Holland Virginia Taylor (born January 14, 1943), is an American actress. She won the 1999 Primetime Emmy Award for Outstanding Supporting Actress in a Drama Series for her role as Judge Roberta Kittleson on ABC's The Practice (1998–2003). For her portrayal of Evelyn Harper on the CBS comedy Two and a Half Men (2003–15), she received a total of four Primetime Emmy Award nominations.

Taylor's other notable television credits include starring roles on the sitcoms Bosom Buddies (1980–82), The Powers That Be (1992–93) and The Naked Truth (1995–98). She also appeared as Jill Ollinger on the soap opera All My Children (1981–83), as Peggy Peabody on The L Word (2004–08), and as Ida Silver on Mr. Mercedes (2017–19). In 2020, she received critical praise and her eighth Primetime Emmy Award nomination for portraying Ellen Kincaid in the Netflix miniseries Hollywood.

Taylor's feature film credits include Romancing the Stone (1984) and its sequel (1985), Alice (1990), To Die For (1995), One Fine Day (1996), George of the Jungle (1997), The Truman Show (1998), Happy Accidents (2000), Keeping the Faith (2000), Legally Blonde (2001), The Wedding Date (2005), Baby Mama (2008), Gloria Bell (2018), Bill & Ted Face the Music (2020), and The Stand In (2020).

Taylor wrote and starred in the one-woman play, Ann (Broadway, 2013), based on the life and work of Ann Richards. For this she received a nomination for the Tony Award for Best Actress. In 2022 she returned to the role for its long-anticipated West Coast premiere at the Pasadena Playhouse, the state theater of California.

Early life 
Taylor was born in 1943 in Philadelphia, Pennsylvania, to Virginia (née Davis), a painter, and C. Tracy Taylor, an attorney. She is the youngest of three daughters in the family; her sisters are Patricia and Pamela, and through Pamela, she is an aunt of director Brad Anderson. She attended high school at Westtown School, a Quaker boarding school in West Chester, Pennsylvania, graduating in 1960. She majored in Theatre at Bennington College, graduating in 1964, before moving to New York City to become an actress.

Career 

Taylor began in the theater. Throughout the 1960s, '70s, and '80s, she appeared in numerous Broadway and off-Broadway productions, including starring roles in Simon Gray's Butley and A. R. Gurney's The Cocktail Hour; for the latter, she was nominated for a Drama Desk award. In 1983, Taylor appeared in Breakfast with Les and Bess, which prompted the New York magazine theatre critic John Simon to sing, "...Miss Taylor is one of the few utterly graceful, attractive, elegant and technically accomplished actresses in our theatre...seeing her may turn you, like me, into a Taylor freak..."

Taylor took the role of Denise Cavanaugh on the soap opera The Edge of Night, who killed herself just to frame her husband. Then encouraged by her acting coach, Stella Adler, Taylor took a role that would make her well known: Tom Hanks' sexy, demanding boss in the 1980s sitcom Bosom Buddies.

She proved herself to be equally adept at both comedy and drama. In 1985, she co-starred with Lisa Eilbacher in the ABC detective series Me and Mom. Two years later, she played opposite Alan Arkin in the short-lived ABC sitcom Harry, in which she received "starring" billing. In 1990, Taylor reunited with former Bosom Buddies executive producers Thomas L. Miller and Robert L. Boyett for a role on their ABC sitcom Going Places, playing grand dame television producer Dawn St. Claire for the show's first 13 episodes. From 1992 to 1993, she starred in Norman Lear's The Powers That Be with John Forsythe and David Hyde Pierce, playing the wife of Forsythe's character, a U.S. senator.

In early 1994, she joined the cast of Saved by the Bell: The College Years as Dean Susan McMann, just episodes before its cancellation. Following this was her role as high-powered newspaper editor Camilla Dane on the ABC/NBC sitcom The Naked Truth; Taylor was one of the few cast members to last through the show's entire run through 1998, despite several retoolings.

She played the part of Judge Roberta Kittleson on The Practice. Originally intended to be a one-time appearance, the role lasted from 1998 to 2003. She won the Primetime Emmy Award for Outstanding Supporting Actress in a Drama Series in 1999; in her acceptance speech, she is remembered for claiming the statue and exclaiming, "Overnight!" Taylor thanked David E. Kelley, The Practices producer/writer and creator, for "giving me a chariot to ride up here on: A woman who puts a flag on the moon for women over 40—who can think, who can work, who are successes, who can cook, and who can COOK!" She was nominated in the same category for the same role the following year.

Taylor was also nominated for the Primetime Emmy Award for Outstanding Guest Actress in a Comedy Series for her recurring role on AMC's The Lot, and has been nominated for Emmys five times since 2003: four for Outstanding Supporting Actress in a Comedy Series for her role on the TV series Two and a Half Men, playing Evelyn Harper, the snobbish, overbearing mother of Charlie Sheen and Jon Cryer's characters, and one for Outstanding Supporting Actress in a Limited Series or Movie for her role as Ellen Kincaid, a studio executive and mentor for aspiring actors, in the miniseries Hollywood. Taylor's television movie and series guest roles have been extensive and include appearances on ER and Veronica's Closet, and recurring roles on Ally McBeal and Monk, and as billionaire Peggy Peabody on The L Word.

Taylor's movie roles have included Reese Witherspoon's character's tough Harvard law professor in the 2001 comedy Legally Blonde, Tina Fey's character's mother in Baby Mama, The Truman Show, Happy Accidents, Next Stop Wonderland, George of the Jungle, The Wedding Date, How to Make an American Quilt, Romancing the Stone, D.E.B.S., Cop and a Half, and One Fine Day.

Taylor's animated roles include that of Prudence, the castle's majordomo and love interest of the Grand Duke, in Disney's Cinderella II and Cinderella III: A Twist in Time. She also played a role in the animated show American Dad! as Francine's biological mother.

Taylor began researching, writing, and producing a one-woman play about the late Texas Governor Ann Richards in 2009. The two-act play, originally titled Money, Marbles, and Chalk, starring Taylor as Richards, was first workshopped in May 2010 at The Grand 1894 Opera House in Galveston, Texas. It was later retitled Ann: An Affectionate Portrait of Ann Richards and opened in Chicago November 16, 2011, where it was billed as a "pre-Broadway" engagement. It played at the Kennedy Center in Washington, D.C., from December 17, 2011, through January 15, 2012. The show next opened on Broadway at the Vivian Beaumont Theatre on March 7, 2013. For this role, Taylor was nominated for the Tony Award for Best Lead Actress in a Play. PBS Great Performances broadcast the premiere of the play, now titled simply Ann, on June 19, 2020. It had been recorded at the Zach Theater in Austin, Texas, following its national tour and Broadway run.

 Personal life 
On November 30, 2015, while answering a question about marriage, in a radio interview with WNYC, Taylor revealed that she was in a relationship with a younger woman and that most of her relationships have been with women. Her partner was later reported to be actress Sarah Paulson. In March 2016, Taylor and Paulson's relationship was confirmed when Paulson stated during an interview that they had been dating since early 2015. In August 2020, Taylor told the LGBTQ&A podcast that she identifies as gay.

Taylor has been a supporter of Aid For AIDS in Los Angeles, serving on their Honorary Board and as an ongoing participant in their largest annual fundraiser, Best In Drag Show, among other fundraising efforts.

 Filmography 
 Film 

 Television 

 Theater BroadwayOff-Broadway'

Awards and nominations

References

External links 

Holland Taylor Bio at CBS – Two and a Half Men

1943 births
Living people
American film actresses
American stage actresses
American television actresses
Bennington College alumni
Outstanding Performance by a Supporting Actress in a Drama Series Primetime Emmy Award winners
Actresses from Philadelphia
20th-century American actresses
21st-century American actresses
HIV/AIDS activists
Westtown School alumni
American lesbian actresses
LGBT people from Pennsylvania